Bury Academy Football Club was a football club based in Bury St Edmunds, England.

History
Ahead of the 1999–2000 season, Bury Academy were formed, gaining admission into the Essex Senior League. Prior to their opening league game against Burnham Ramblers, the Daily Gazette described the club as a "young but very skilful, organised side, but they may find senior league football a little too physical". Bury Academy subsequently lost the game 3–1. After losing their opening four games, conceding 15 and scoring twice, manager Joe Taylor resigned. In total, the club played eight games in all competitions, scoring twice and conceding 35 goals, before resigning from the Essex Senior League on 1 October 1999, the day before they were due to play East Ham United.

Ground
During the club's short history, they groundshared with Bury Town at Ram Meadow.

References

External links

Bury St Edmunds
Essex Senior Football League
Defunct football clubs in Suffolk
1999 establishments in England
Association football clubs established in 1999
1999 disestablishments in England
Association football clubs disestablished in 1999
University and college football clubs in England